The 2016–17 Pittsburgh Panthers men's basketball team represented the University of Pittsburgh during the 2016–17 NCAA Division I men's basketball season. The team played its home games at the Petersen Events Center in Pittsburgh, Pennsylvania. The Panthers were led by first-year head coach Kevin Stallings as members of the Atlantic Coast Conference. They finished the season 16–17, 4–14 in ACC play to finish in a tie for 13th place. Pitt had their first losing season in 17 years. They defeated Georgia Tech in the first round of the ACC tournament to advance to the second round where they lost to Virginia.

On January 24, 2017, Pitt lost by 55 points to Louisville, the team's worst loss since 1906.

Previous season
The Panthers finished the 2015–16 season 21–12, 9–9 in ACC play to finish in a tie for ninth place. They defeated Syracuse in the second round of the ACC tournament before losing to North Carolina in the quarterfinals. They received an at-large bid to the NCAA tournament where, as a No. 10 seed, they lost in the First Round to Wisconsin.

Following the season, head coach Jamie Dixon left the school to take the head coaching position at his alma mater, TCU. On March 27, 2016, the school hired Kevin Stallings as head coach.

Offseason

Departures

Incoming transfers

2016 recruiting class

2017 recruiting class

Roster

}
}

Schedule and results

|-
!colspan=12 style=| Exhibition

|-
!colspan=12 style=| Non-conference regular season

|-
!colspan=12 style=| ACC regular season

|-
!colspan=9 style=| ACC Tournament

Rankings

*AP does not release post-NCAA tournament rankings

Footnotes

References

Pittsburgh Panthers men's basketball seasons
Pittsburgh
Pittsburgh
Pittsburgh